Gold FM is one of the retro stations in Sri Lanka. The station was launched in September 1998. Catering to a mature audience, Gold FM plays music  from the 1960s, 1970s, 1980s and 1990s. Gold FM broadcasts live from the 35th Floor of the World Trade Center. The station broadcasts on 93.0 & 93.2 FM in Sri Lanka. Gold FM is a part of the ABC Radio Network.

External links
Official Gold FM website
Sri Lanka shuts radio station over rebel attack story
Gold FM celebrates ninth anniversary
Golden memories with Gold FM
Listen Online Gold FM

English-language radio stations in Sri Lanka
Asia Broadcasting Corporation
Mass media in Colombo